Parliamentary elections were held in Ukraine on 28 October 2012. Because of various reasons, including the "impossibility of announcing election results" various by-elections have taken place since. Hence, several constituencies have been left unrepresented at various times.

Unlike the two previous elections, this election used a parallel voting system (with half the seats elected by party-list proportional representation with a 5% election threshold and the other half by first-past-the-post voting in single-member constituencies,  with alliances no longer allowed. The parallel voting system was used previously in 1998 and 2002.

The election campaign was limited to 90 days. Every citizen of Ukraine 18 years of age or older was able to vote in 33,540 polling stations in Ukraine and 116 foreign polling stations in 77 countries.

The Party of Regions won the largest number of seats while Fatherland (with several parties together as an "umbrella" party) came second. The election was also noted for the rise of the far-right party Svoboda, which came in fourth. The new (on the national scene) party UDAR also enjoyed noticeable great success with its third place in the election. The far-left Communist Party of Ukraine almost tripled its numbers of voters but because of the mixed election system used in the election it only won five more seats compared with the previous election. Because of this mixed system three small parties and 43 unaffiliated politicians also made it into parliament.

The new parliament was appointed and started its tasks on 12 December 2012 – six weeks after the elections. This was the last national Ukrainian election Crimea participated in before the annexation of Crimea by the Russian Federation in 2014.

Background

Political crises and cancelled 2008 snap elections

On October 8, 2008 Ukrainian President Viktor Yushchenko tried to dissolve the Verkhovna Rada (parliament) and called early parliamentary elections in Ukraine for the second time in as many years for December 7, 2008. The right of the President to dismiss the parliament was challenged in Ukraine's Constitutional Court. The President's decree has since lapsed as it was never put into action (the coalition supporting the second Tymoshenko Government was extended) and appeals to Ukraine's Constitutional Court were withdrawn. Nevertheless, a snap election was predicted by Ukrainian politicians during the 2010 presidential election and after the dismissal of the second Tymoshenko Government. One of the arguments against holding early elections were the costs. Early elections were (in October 2008) estimated to cost approximately UAH₴417 million (about EUR€60 million or US$80 million).

2012 election date set
On February 1, 2011 the Verkhovna Rada set the election date for October 28, 2012. Several deputies whose votes were registered that day have stated they could not have taken part in voting because they were not in Kyiv (where the Verkhovna Rada building is located) on February 1, 2011. Voting by MPs in the place of absent MPs of the Verkhovna Rada is prohibited by law. On July 27, 2012 the Central Election Commission of Ukraine announced that campaigning for the elections would commence on July 30.

Changes in the voting system

In June 2011 the Venice Commission reviewed a proposed Draft Law on the election of Ukrainian parliamentary members. The proposal sought to re-instate a parallel voting system – used in the 1998 and 2002 elections – with the establishment of 225 local single-member districts elected (in one round) by a first-past-the-post electoral system (candidate with the highest vote total wins); and the remaining 225 parliamentary seats being elected nationwide on a proportional party-list system with a 5% support threshold; and excluding political blocs from all elections. The option "Vote against all" was also made defunct in the proposal (according to a November 2012 opinion poll by Research & Branding Group (otherwise) 17% of the voters would have voted "against everybody" during the elections). The opposition and Ukrainian analysts accused the Party of Regions of "rewriting the law so that the president could secure a majority in the next Verkhovna Rada." In October 2011 the Venice Commission recommended Ukraine should not return to a mixed election system. Nevertheless, on 17 November 2011 the Ukrainian Parliament approved an election law almost identical to the June 2011 proposed Draft Law. This new law satisfied the major opposition parties Batkivschyna and Front for Change; but was condemned by the core party of Our Ukraine–People's Self-Defense Bloc, Our Ukraine. Candidates could be elected on party lists or through self-nomination. On 8 December 2011 President Viktor Yanukovych signed the new election law. Since then several parties merged with other parties.

The possibility to be simultaneously be nominated on a nationwide party list and in a single mandate constituency also was declared unconstitutional by the Constitutional Court of Ukraine on 10 April 2012.

Voters could temporarily change their place of voting without changing their permanent voting address.

Issues

Fraud suspicions and accusations

From 2011 to 2013 with liaison to Serhiy Lyovochkin, Alan Friedman, Eckart Sager, who was a one time CNN producer, Rick Gates, Paul Manafort, and Manafort's senior aide Konstantin Kilimnik devised a strategy to discredit then Ukrainian Prime Minister Yulia Tymoshenko along with then United States Secretary of State Hillary Clinton who had been an outspoken critic of pro-Russia, pro-Kremlin, and pro-Putin supporters in Ukraine. Manafort's Global Endeavour Inc., a St. Vincent and Grenadines based consulting and lobbying company, his Lucicle Consultants Ltd., a Cyprus based consulting company, and three other of his companies were hired to provide support to then President of Ukraine Viktor Yanukovich and his Party of Regions. This strategy included: creating a fake think tank in Vienna, Austria, the Center for the Study of Former Soviet Socialist Republics (CXSSR), to support Yanukovich and his Party of Regions; using a social media blitz with Twitter, YouTube, and Facebook, and altering the Google's search stack to disseminate articles and videos that undermine opponents of the Party of Regions and Yanukovich in Europe and the United States; rewriting Wikipedia articles to smear Yanukovich opponents especially Tymoshenko; and using Breitbart News, RedState, and an article in The Wall Street Journal to discredit the Obama State Department and Hillary Clinton herself. Alan Friedman, who had not registered as a foreign agent in the United States, told Kostyantyn Gryshchenko that Friedman, who often wrote using the pen name Matthew Lina, published dozens of positive stories about the Party of Regions and Yanukovich and ensured that these were disseminated to over 2,000 publications and placed at the top of Google search stacks. Known as the Tymoshenko Files, Friedman sent Manafort a highly confidential two page letter detailing Friedman's efforts and that Friedman would claim to be Inna Bohoslovska to ghost pen articles on her behalf. In October 2012 after Hillary Clinton had supported Tymoshenko, Brietbart News released an article calling Hillary Clinton a “neo-Nazi Frankenstein”.

Before election day candidates and analysts predicted that bribery to secure votes would be rampant. A March 2012 poll by Research & Branding Group showed that 66% of the respondents believed that the election would not be fair, 18% disagreed with that. In June 2012 the Committee of Voters of Ukraine declared that the use of government resources for partisan ends would not be decisive in the (then upcoming) elections.

Following the elections the parties Fatherland, UDAR and Svoboda filled in an appeal at the Central Election Commission of Ukraine (CVK) with allegations of fraud in 13 simple-majority constituencies. Irregularities in the elections like cases of ballot stuffing, carousel voting, suspiciously high voter turnout and bribed voters have been reported. On 30 October 2012 the Committee of Voters of Ukraine stated that the elections saw a record number of cases of bribery of voters. They also insisted the elections had not brought the country closer to democratic standards. And that although there were no grounds to believe that the violations that were reported on polling day could affect the election results, the election results could seriously be affected by violations during the counting of votes.

According to Opora the most common violations of the electoral law during the election campaign in August were using government resources for partisan purposes and vote buying. According to Opora the Party of Regions committed the most violations of the electoral law. On 28 October 2012 Party of Regions itself claimed to have documented 607 violations of the election legislation by its opponents. According to Taras Kuzio Berkut riot police was used in attempts to destroy ballots.

On 1 November 2012 the Deputy Chairwoman of the Central Election Commission of Ukraine (CVK), Zhanna Usenko-Chorna, stated that the elections were heavily falsified. She indicated that several electoral districts clearly demonstrate a depravity of the single-constituency district elections in Ukraine and that as of 1 November CVK still had not received results from 14 electoral districts. According to her that was the main reason why CVK could not announce the complete results of the elections on the scheduled time, 31 October 2012.

In mid-February 2012 Bloc Yulia Tymoshenko deputy Roman Zabzalyuk stated that "if the results on Election Day can't be sufficiently fixed" the Party of Regions had already made plans to bribe deputies to join the Party of Regions after their election into the Parliament; representatives of the Party of Regions denied allegations of bribery or plans to fix the election.

Issues at districts

Kyiv and its region
A notably reported scandal took place at the electoral district 215 where initially a win was awarded to the acting chairman of the Kyiv city council Halyna Hereha. After the results were challenged it was decided to recount the votes with about 30 law enforcement personnel to keep public order. Later everything was resolved and cleared that indeed the votes between the two candidates Hereha (independent) and Andriy Illyenko ("Svoboda") were switched around. On November 1, 2012 Halyna Hereha officially complained about the elections, she stated that she did not intend to take it to court.

To another electoral district 211 in Kyiv was sent an ambulance as a deputy chairman of the district electoral commission had a nervous breakdown. The commission of the district for three days had a difficult time to count all the votes.

Another big scandal with involvement of the riot law enforcement unit of Berkut took place at the 95th electoral district (a Kyivan suburban city of Irpin). The electoral commission at the district was the slowest and the public involvement surely did not help to speed up the process, however a possible miscounting was prevented. Previously, a possible riot from a big "youth group of athletic posture" was suspected by witnesses.

Another scandal took place at the 223rd district where some fist fighting took place, which was eventually extinguished with the help of law enforcement. Oleh Tyahnybok told Ukrayinska Pravda that "Svoboda" will be picketing "EpiCenter" supermarkets and apartments of the 223rd electoral district commission members. Because of the incident, Radio Liberty (Radio Svoboda) conducts a live broadcasting from the headquarters of the district. In protest the district electoral commission refuses to continue its work.

Southern Ukraine
At the 132nd district (Pervomaisk, Mykolaiv Oblast) peasants laid a siege around the building of the district electoral commission in the protest of post-electoral results. According to Batkivshchyna it had been defrauded a win in the district in favour of a candidate of Party of Regions.

Repeat elections in 5 constituencies
The Central Election Commission of Ukraine adopted a resolution on November 5 recognizing the impossibility of announcing election results in five single-seat constituencies (electoral districts 94, 132, 194, 197 and 223); it also recognized the need to hold repeat elections in these constituencies and asked parliament to take a decision on holding repeat elections in these constituencies. On November 6 the Verkhovna Rada adopted a resolution that proposed repeat elections. On 8 November the Central Election Commission stated that the Verkhovna Rada should thus make a respective law for this and the Cabinet of Ministers of Ukraine should determine the amount of funding for these elections.

On 29 December 2012, the Constitutional Court of Ukraine received a query from 54 Verkhovna Rada members concerning procedures for the five repeat elections. As of 21 March 2013 the Constitutional Court has not opened a case on this issue. The current Verkhovna Rada parliamentary majority refused to consider the scheduling of repeated elections in the five constituencies before the court issues its ruling on this issue.

On 5 September 2013 the Verkhovna Rada set the date of (all, see below) 7 re-elections to 15 December 2013.

Repeat elections in 2 more constituencies
In early February 2013 the Higher Administrative Court of Ukraine ordered the Central Election Commission of Ukraine to hold new elections in 2 more districts after the court removed the deputy mandates of United Centre member Pavlo Baloha (at the time a member of the Party of Regions parliamentary faction) and independent Oleksandr Dombrovsky. The Administrative Court established that the results in single-member districts number 11 (Vinnytsia Oblast; Dombrovsky) and number 71 (Zakarpattia Oblast; Baloha) after the 2012 elections had been "unreliable". On 3 July 2013 Baloha's and Dombrovsky's mandates were officially cancelled.

On 5 September 2013 the Verkhovna Rada set the date of (all, see above) 7 re-elections to 15 December 2013.

By-election in constituency 224 (Sevastopol)
On 24 December 2012 President Viktor Yanukovych appointed Pavlo Lebedyev as Defense Minister. Lebedyev had been elected as a lawmaker in the single-seat constituency No. 224 (in Sevastopol) in the 2012 election (28 October 2012). On 22 March 2013 the Verkhovna Rada cancelled his parliamentary mandate. The by-election for the single-seat constituency No. 224 was held on 7 July 2013 and won by independent Vadim Novinsky with 53.41% with a turnout of 23.91%. Before the election Novinsky had stated he would join the Party of Regions if he won.

Repeat elections in constituency 133 (Odesa)
On 12 September 2013 the Higher Administrative Court of Ukraine (under a lawsuit lodged by Yuriy Karmazin) ruled it impossible to reliably establish the results of 28 October 2012 elections in single-mandate constituency No. 133 (in Odessa), at the time Ihor Markov had been declared winner of that constituency. The court overturned the Central Election Commission (CEC) decision of 23 November 2012 regarding Markov's registration as a People's Deputy of Ukraine and ordered the CEC to take measures to organize, prepare for and hold repeat elections in constituency No. 133.

Police officers had documented the use of pens with disappearing ink in at least 40 polling stations in constituency No. 133 on 28 October 2012.

Repeat elections in five constituencies of 15 December 2013
The Central Election Commission of Ukraine finalized the vote count on 12 November 2012 but simultaneously ordered – on recommendation of the Verkhovna Rada (Ukraine's parliament) – repeat elections in five troubled single-mandate constituencies where it could not establish results. Because of occurrences in these five constituencies. In February 2013 the Higher Administrative Court of Ukraine ordered to hold (additional) new elections in 2 more districts after the court removed the mandates of two seats. On 5 September 2013 the Verkhovna Rada itself set the date of these 7 re-elections to 15 December 2013. Hence, before 15 December 2013 of the 450 seats in parliament 443 deputies have been elected. But eventually only repeat elections were held in 5 constituencies on 15 December 2013.

By-election in constituency 83 (West Ivano-Frankivsk)
In February 2014 Oleksandr Sych became Vice Prime Minister in the Yatsenyuk Government. Sych had been elected as a lawmaker in the single-seat constituency No. 83 (West Ivano-Frankivsk) in the 2012 election of 28 October 2012.

The by-election for the single-seat constituency No. 83 was held on 25 May 2014 and won by independent Olexandr Shevchenko with 37.6% with a turnout of 37.66%. The candidate of the party of Sych, Svoboda, came third with 14.9%.

Campaign
Andriy Klyuyev was the chief campaign manager for the Party of Regions. The Party of Regions' campaign focused heavily on promoting its record as the ruling party, contrasting the "stability" of the (then current) Azarov Government with "chaos" during the Second Tymoshenko Government in 2007–10 (which it referred to as: "the chaos and ruins of 5 years of orange leadership",. It advocated a "balanced" approach to developing relations with Russia and the West, saying neither should be given priority over the other.

Fatherland tried to paint the election as a battle of good against evil and pledged to impeach President Viktor Yanukovych. The party stated it advocated "European values" and promised to reverse the Azarov Government policy of raising the status of the Russian language.

UDAR avoided sensitive and polarising subjects and focused instead on popular topics, such as more empowerment to ordinary Ukrainians and a ruthless campaign against corruption, the indifference of the authorities, the lack of local governance, inequality and poverty.

Svoboda softened their rhetoric in the campaign but nevertheless promised to shake up the country's political status quo.

One of the biggest spenders of the campaign was the party Ukraine – Forward!. One of their election billboards claimed that “an average wage of EUR€1,000 and a pension of €500” was realistic for Ukraine (the monthly average wage was €300 at the time).

Many candidates in single-seat constituencies tended to focus on local issues, often distancing themselves from party agendas.

Overall the election programs of the major parties bore many similarities; all pledged reforms to spur economic growth, higher wages, pensions and other benefits, better education and medical care.

Two weeks before the (28 October) election UDAR withdrew 26 of its candidates running in single-member constituencies in favour of Fatherland candidates and they withdrew 26 parliamentary candidates in favor of UDAR in an attempt to maximise votes for the opposition.

Costs
Political parties spent more than US$75 million on the election campaign in multi-member constituencies (according to the parties' official reports). The Party of Regions spent about US$27 million, Fatherland more than $13 million, UDAR more than $4 million, the Communist Party of Ukraine $9 million, Our Ukraine $8 million and Ukraine – Forward! $7.6 million. Svoboda claimed it had spent US$3 million on the campaign. The Ukraine of the Future did not spend anything on campaigning yet still managed to take the 15th spot amongst the 21 parties who participated in the nationwide list with 0.18% of the votes.

Denys Kovrizhenko of the International Foundation for Electoral Systems – Ukraine stated the sum of money spend could be up to 10 times more than what parties report afterwards. According to OPORA “In general, candidates spend about three times more than they officially report to spend”. Political scientist Artem Bidenko estimated other figures; he believed that the Party of Regions had spent around $850 million, Ukraine – Forward some $150 million, and the election campaigns of the rest of the political parties $350 million, while candidates in majority constituencies had spent some $900 million on the election campaign. About half of the single-constituency candidates submitted reports about their campaign spending.

In October 2008 Ukrainian experts estimated that a small political party who wants to win seats in parliament would spend up to US$30 million on the campaign and large political parties would spend up to $100 million. Political analyst Pavlo Bulhak stated then that a party's election budget will be spent on advertising on television, bribing voters, organizing rallies and party propaganda.

Results 

On 8 November the Central Election Commission of Ukraine completed and released all results of the nationwide party list the constituencies (the elections took place on 28 October). Meanwhile, the Central Election Commission refused to establish the election results for the first-past-post results in 5 constituencies.
The Central Election Commission of Ukraine finalized the vote count on 12 November 2012 but simultaneously ordered - on recommendation of the Verkhovna Rada - repeat elections (on a yet unknown date) in five troubled single-mandate constituencies where it could not establish results. Because of occurrences in these five constituencies. Hence, on 12 November 2012 445 deputies had been elected of the 450 seats in parliament. On 8 February 2013 the Supreme Administrative Court of Ukraine deprived 2 more deputies of power. They were banned from parliament on 3 July 2013. On 5 September 2013 the Verkhovna Rada itself set the date of all 7 re-elections to 15 December 2013.

By electoral district
Next to the 87 political parties 1150 independent candidates took part in the 225 electoral districts.

Several lawmakers elected into the new parliament have family ties with other lawmakers or other family members in the executive branch of Ukrainian politics.

Turnout

The total voter turnout in the election was 57.99%; about average for parliamentary elections in Ukraine. On election day turnout had reached 22.43% by noon local time. The number of reported participating voters varied somewhere between 20.76 million and 20.78 million, while the number of invalid ballots accumulated to about 1.2 million (5.74%) for party list voting and voting at districts.

The lowest turnout was in Crimea (with 49.46%), the highest in Lviv Oblast (67.13%). Local disparities in turnout did occur: for example, the voting turnout figures in two adjacent districts in Donetsk were 39.8% and 84.5%.

Forming of new government
On 9 December President Viktor Yanukovych nominated Mykola Azarov for a new term as Prime Minister. This nomination was approved by parliament on 13 December 2012. 252 deputies of the 450 deputies supported the nomination; the whole factions of Party of Regions (210 deputies) and Communist Party (32 deputies) and ten independent deputies.

The second Azarov Government was appointed by Yanukovych on 24 December 2012.

Reactions
Fatherland, UDAR and Svoboda stated 12 November they did not recognize the results and would challenge them in local and international courts. In a joint statement the three parties vowed to work towards the impeachment of President Viktor Yanukovych, the resignation of the Azarov Government and chief prosecutor Viktor Pshonka, and the release from jail of Yulia Tymoshenko "and other political prisoners".

Prime Minister Mykola Azarov and President Yanukovych praised the elections.

Party leader Petro Symonenko of the Communist Party of Ukraine believed on 8 November that the new parliament could not work better than the present one, as "there will be a confrontation between the financial, political and clan groups who got seats in the new parliament." He also stated then that his party will not form any coalition with other groups in the new parliament.

Civil movement "Chesno" stated on 5 December 2012 that 331 out of the 450 deputies elected on 28 October fell short of its criteria for honesty; according to "Chesno"'s parameters, 114 of them violated the rights and freedoms of citizens, 30 earlier changed their political position while working in parliament or on local councils, 233 had been involved in corrupt practices, 185 had nontransparent incomes and expenses, 156 did not personally take part in voting in previous parliaments, and 101 had shirked work in parliament.

Party of Regions politician Sergei Tigipko stated in December 2012 "the parliamentary elections showed that politics in Ukraine is becoming more ideological".

International reactions
 European Union – On 12 November 2012 the High Representative of the Union for Foreign Affairs and Security Policy Catherine Ashton and European Commissioner for Enlargement and European Neighbourhood Policy Stefan Fule stated "We express our concern about the conduct of the post electoral process, which was marred by irregularities, delays in the vote count and lack of transparency in the electoral commissions". The also expected to see "swift and determined action" to bring Ukraine's electoral legislation "into line with European norms and standards on the basis of an Election Code".
 United States – United States Secretary of State Hillary Clinton stated in late October 2012 about the election: "We share the view of OSCE monitors that Sunday's election constituted a step backward for Ukrainian democracy". Vice President of the United States Joe Biden voiced concerns over the elections in a call with President Viktor Yanukovych on 13 November 2012 and end urged Ukraine to "end selective prosecutions".
 European Parliament – A resolution adopted by the parliament on 13 December 2012 stated: "(We) expresses regret at the fact that, according to the OSCE, PACE, NATO Parliamentary Assembly and European Parliament observers, the election campaign, electoral process and post-electoral process failed to meet major international standards and constitute a step backwards compared with the national elections in 2010.
 Poland – According to President Bronislaw Komorowski the results of the elections showed "the success of pro-European spirit in the country". Because all political parties that made it into parliament, but the Communist Party of Ukraine, declared European integration of the country as one of their goals.

International observers
On election day (28 October) there were 3,500 accredited foreign observers. The observers from the European Academy for Elections Observation (most of whom where European Parliament members), stated it was "a good election, not perfect but clearly acceptable", and that it was "in compliance with democratic norms". On 29 October the Organization for Security and Co-operation in Europe (OSCE) (who had monitored the election with 600 observers) stated in a preliminary report that "certain aspects of the pre-election period constituted a step backwards compared with recent national elections" and that the election was marred by "the abuse of power and the excessive role of money". It complained of "a lack of a level playing field, caused primarily by the abuse of administrative resources, lack of transparency of campaign and party financing, and lack of balanced media coverage". This contrasted sharply with the international observers' conclusions on Ukraine's February 2010 presidential election, judged then to have been transparent, unbiased and an "impressive display" of democracy.

Ten thousand foreign observers where expected to observe the elections. Some 100 long term observers from OSCE member states arrived in Ukraine starting from the middle of September 2012, followed by 600 short-term observers who will arrive a week before the elections to monitor the election process at voting stations.

Poland is to send observers to Ukraine to monitor the elections, Polish Foreign Minister Radosław Sikorski stated on 8 February 2012. German Ambassador to Ukraine  stated "Germany is planning to send a numerous group of official supervisors" on 13 March 2012.

The total number of registered observers on October 9, was 1053 persons. The largest mission of international observers from CIS-EMO was 197 people.

On 2 October 2012 CIS-EMO observers presented the Interim report of the CIS-EMO Election Monitoring Mission. The report, in particular, noted that "The majority of detected violations are connected not with a political struggle of party lists but with the struggle of single-seat candidates". An impression that “antidemocratic power” clash with “democratic opposition” imposed by European and world society has a very relative nature that, as a rule, doesn’t distinct the real situation. In nowadays Ukrainian “peripheral capitalism” model such classes as “power” and “opposition” are conventionality. When the “Power Elite” is unconsolidated and disconnected and there is an open internal war between leading financial-industrial groups and corporations of Ukraine to get leverage of real state authority, all existing political parties only play the role of institutionalized political framework of realization of oligarchs’ economic interests.

On 5 October 2012 the CIS-EMO report was presented at the annual meeting of the OSCE Office for Democratic Institutions and Human Rights. Shortly before the presentation of CIS-EMO interim report web-site of CIS-EMO had been subjected to a massive DDoS-attack. The report was published on the official website of the OSCE in English and Ukrainian and also in Russian.

The ENEMO (European Network of Election Monitoring Organizations) mission for the 2012 parliamentary elections in Ukraine began its work on 23 July 2012 with the arrival of four Core Team members. ENEMO is the first international election observation mission registered for the Parliamentary Elections 2012 by the Central Election Commission (CEC). 35 LTOs (long-term observers) arrived to Kyiv on 5 August 2012 and were deployed throughout Ukraine. Long-term observer teams cover one or two oblasts of Ukraine. On E-day, October 28, ENEMO deployed 43 STO (Short-term observer) teams throughout all oblasts of Ukraine.

Factions in parliament after elections
According to the amendment to parliamentary regulations adopted in November 2012, the smallest faction of parliament can be formed out a party with the smallest number of deputies elected by a party list and a single constituency vote. That amendment to regulations can also be interpreted as "either or" meaning that the smallest faction can be formed either based on party list or a single constituency election. In that case the smaller parties' deputies that were elected to the parliament will be able to form factions of their own, making it more challenging to form a coalition in the Ukrainian parliament.

On 27 November 2012 Party of Regions parliamentary leader Oleksandr Yefremov claimed that 223 members of the Verkhovna Rada had already expressed their desire to work in his party's fraction; according to earlier press reports 38 of the 43 unaffiliated politicians elected into parliament would join the Party of Regions faction. 
{| class=wikitable style="text-align:center"
|- style="vertical-align:bottom;"
! rowspan=3 |
! colspan=9 | Party (Shading indicates majority caucus)
! rowspan=3 | Total
! rowspan=3 | Vacant
|- style="height:5px"
| 
| 
| 
| 
| 
| 
| 
| 
| 
|-
! Party of Regions
! Batkivshchyna
! UDAR
! Svoboda
! Communists
! Economic Development
! Sovereign European Ukraine
! For Peace and Stability
! Non-affiliated
|-
! style="font-size:80%" | End of previous convocation Пам'ятні моменти Верховної Ради VI скликання Memorable moments of the Verkhovna Rada of VI convocation, RBC Ukraine (28 October 2012)   
|  | 
| 97
| DNP
| DNP
| 25
| DNP
| DNP
| DNP
| 31
! 348
| 102 
|-
| colspan=7 |
|-
! style="font-size:80%" | Begin
|  | 
| 101
| 40
| 37
| rowspan=15| 32
| rowspan=8 | -
| rowspan=9 | -
| rowspan=23 | -
| 43
! 438
| 12
|-
! style="font-size:80%" | December 12, 2012
|  | 
| 99
| rowspan=12 | 42
| rowspan=10 | 36
| 27
! rowspan=2 | 444
| rowspan=2 | 6 
|-
! style="font-size:80%" | June 11, 2013
|  | 
| 93
| 34
|-
! style="font-size:80%" | December 31, 2013
|  | 
| rowspan=2 | 90
| 38
! rowspan=2 | 442
| rowspan=2 | 8 
|-
! style="font-size:80%" | February 21, 2014
|  | 
| 55
|-
! style="font-size:80%" | February 22, 2014Parliamentarians drop Regions Party faction one by one Interfax Ukraine. 22 February 2014. Accessed 22 February 2014
|  | 
| rowspan=6 | 88
| 115
! rowspan=2 | 447
| rowspan=2 | 3 
|-
! style="font-size:80%" | February 23, 2014
|  | 
| 118
|-
! style="font-size:80%" | February 24, 2014
|  | 
| 123
! rowspan=4 | 449
| rowspan=4 | 1 
|-
! style="font-size:80%" | February 25, 2014
|  | 
| 33
| 91
|-
! style="font-size:80%" | February 27, 2014
|  rowspan=2 | 
| 32
| 37
| 60
|-
! style="font-size:80%" | February 28, 2014
| rowspan=2 | 36
| rowspan=9 | 36
| 57
|-
! style="font-size:80%" | March 4, 2014
|  | 
| 87
| 33
| 60
! 445
| 5
|-
! style="font-size:80%" | March 15, 2014
|  rowspan=3| 
| 88
| 35
| rowspan=3 | 37
| rowspan=3 | 58
! 448
| 2
|-
! style="font-size:80%" | March 18, 2014
| 82
| rowspan=4 | 41
| 33
! 439
| 11
|-
! style="font-size:80%" | March 25, 2014
| rowspan=6 | 88
| 35
! 447
| 3
|-
! style="font-size:80%" | April 8, 2014
|  | 
| 34
| rowspan=5 | 33
| rowspan=2 | 38
| 68
! 446
| 4
|-
! style="font-size:80%" | April 10, 2014
|  | 
| rowspan=10 | 35
| 70
! 449
| 1
|-
! style="font-size:80%" | April 11, 2014
|  | 
| 42
| rowspan=2| 37
| 71
! 448
| 2
|-
! style="font-size:80%" | April 20, 2014
|  | 
| rowspan=3 | 41
| 72
! 446
| 4
|-
! style="font-size:80%" | May 16, 2014
|  rowspan=2 | 
| 39
| rowspan=8 | 35
| 73
! 447
| 3
|-
! style="font-size:80%" | May 29, 2014
| 87
| 31
| rowspan=5| 40
| 74
! 446
| 4
|-
! style="font-size:80%" | June 6, 2014
| rowspan=3 | 80
|  | 
| 40
| 32
| 95
! 442
| 8
|-
! style="font-size:80%" | July 1, 2014
|  rowspan=5 | 
| rowspan=5 | 41
| rowspan=2 | 24
| 104
! rowspan=5 | 445
| rowspan=5 | 5 
|-
! style="font-size:80%" | July 2, 2014
| 32
| rowspan=2 | 73
|-
! style="font-size:80%" | July 4, 2014
| rowspan=3 | 78
| 23
| rowspan=2 | 34
|-
! style="font-size:80%" | July 24, 2014
| rowspan=2 | -
| rowspan=2 | 41
| 95
|-
! style="font-size:80%" | July 25, 2014
| 35
| 36
| 93
|-
|-
! Latest voting share
| 
!  | 
| 
| 
| 
| 
| 
| 
| 
! colspan=2 |
|-
|colspan="12"|Note: The parties United Centre (3 seats), People's Party (2 seats), Radical Party of Oleh Lyashko (1 seat) and Union (1 seat) did not form their own faction. Their deputies did not join any faction besides 1 deputy of People's Party who became a member of the Party of Regions faction in December 2012 and Union's deputy joined the then newly created faction For Peace and Stability on 2 July 2014. Dynamics in the fraction For Peace and Stability in the VII convocation, Verkhovna Rada

The Communist Party of Ukraine faction was dissolved 24 July 2014 two days after parliament had changed its regulations.
|-
|}

Removing deputies from parliament after 2012 election

Since 8 February 2013 four parliamentarians have been deprived of their mandate by the Higher Administrative Court of Ukraine.

Registered parties
In contrast with the 2007 parliamentary elections, candidates in this election could be elected on party lists or through self-nomination. There were 87 parties registered for the elections to compete in electoral districts. For the nationwide list the voters could choose between 22 parties. Several parties united together under "umbrella" parties. For example, the election list of All-Ukrainian Union "Fatherland" included members of Reforms and Order Party, People's Movement of Ukraine, Front of Changes, For Ukraine, People's Self-Defense, Civil Position and Social Christian Party. This electoral list was the result of negotiations within the opposition Dictatorship Resistance Committee.

Nationwide list
The Central Election Commission of Ukraine had registered 22 parties who would participate on the nationwide list. On 15 October 2012 Ukrainian Platform "Assembly" withdrew itself from the national list (it had received ballot number 1) but the other ballot numbers did not change. So the ballot numbers were:

 No party
 Socialist Party of Ukraine
 Communist Party of Ukraine
 Political Union "Native Fatherland"
 Russian Bloc
 Party of Nataliya Korolevska "Ukraine – Forward!"
 All-Ukrainian Union "Community"
 Ukrainian National Assembly
 Liberal Party of Ukraine
 New Politics
 All-Ukrainian Union "Svoboda"
 Ukrainian Party "Green Planet"
 Party of Pensioners of Ukraine
 Our Ukraine (Our Ukraine, Ukrainian People's Party, Congress of Ukrainian Nationalists)
 Greens
 Party of Greens of Ukraine
 UDAR of Vitaliy Klychko
 Ukraine of the Future
 All-Ukrainian Union "Fatherland" (All-Ukrainian Union "Fatherland", People's Movement of Ukraine, People's Self-Defense, Front of Changes, For Ukraine!, Reforms and Order, Social-Christian Party, Civil Position)
 Party of Regions
 People's Labor Union of Ukraine
 Radical Party of Oleh Lyashko

Public opinion polls
Note that on 17 November 2011 the Ukrainian Parliament approved an election law under which 225 members of Parliament would be elected under party lists and 225 would be winners of constituencies. Simultaneously the option to vote "Against all" had been made defunct; furthermore candidates could be elected on party lists or through self-nomination.

See also
Civil movement "Chesno"

References

External links
 Central Election Commission of Ukraine
 Interactive election result maps by Ukrayinska Pravda
 Map of the election's result by polling places
 UkrainianElection2012.org
 Organization for Security and Cooperation in Europe final report on parliamentary election
 Interim report of the CIS-EMO Election Monitoring Mission
 Electua.org - We follow elections
 Raw data from CEC in spreadsheet format

National Sociological Research Centers
 Center of Sociological Studies "Sofiya" (Sofiya) (website)
 Kyiv International Institute of Sociology (KIIS)
 Razumkov Centre
 Research & Branding Group (R&B)
 Center of Sociological and Political Studies (SOCIS)
 Democratic Initiatives Foundation (DIF) (website)
 National Institute of Strategic Studies (NISS) (website)
 Sociological group "RATING" (Rating)
Foreign Sociological Research Centers
  Fund of Public Opinion (FOM-Ukraine)
  Society for Consumer Research (GfK)

Parliamentary elections in Ukraine
Ukraine
Parliamentary
7th Ukrainian Verkhovna Rada
Parliamentary